Lars Fredrik Nelson (born 19 August 1985, Funäsdalen) is a Swedish cross-country skier.

Biography 
He represented Sweden at the 2014 Winter Olympics in Sochi. On 16 February he competed in the first (classical) leg in the men's team relay and became an Olympic champion, together with his team mates Daniel Richardsson, Johan Olsson, and Marcus Hellner. Nelson showed the best time in his lap, despite losing a ski at one point. Previously, he participated in skiathlon, where he finished 10th, and 15 km classical (15th).

Nelson participated in the 2004 Junior World Championship. He was not selected for the 2010 Olympics and in fact did not ski a World Cup race until November 2011, when he finished 53rd in the 25 km race in Kuusamo. Before the 2014 Olympics, his best performance in a World Cup race was 7th place achieved in Toblach on 1 February 2014 at the 15 km classical distance. He was not selected for the 2013 World Championships.

Cross-country skiing results
All results are sourced from the International Ski Federation (FIS).

Olympic Games
 1 medal – (1 gold)

World Championships

World Cup

Season standings

References

1985 births
Swedish male cross-country skiers
Cross-country skiers at the 2014 Winter Olympics
Olympic cross-country skiers of Sweden
Medalists at the 2014 Winter Olympics
Olympic medalists in cross-country skiing
Olympic gold medalists for Sweden
Living people